Leptosteges vestaliella is a moth in the family Crambidae. It was described by Zeller in 1872. It is found in North America, where it has been recorded from Florida, Mississippi, Oklahoma, South Carolina and Texas.

The wingspan is about 12–13 mm. Adults have been recorded on wing from May to October.

References

Moths described in 1872
Schoenobiinae